Robert or Bobby Nunn may refer to:

Robert Nunn (American football) (born 1965), American football defensive line coach
Bobby Nunn (doo-wop musician) (1925–1986), American singer with The Robins and The Coasters
Bobby Nunn (R&B musician), American R&B producer, songwriter and vocalist 
Robert Nunn (songwriter) (1808–1853), Tyneside singer and songwriter

See also 
 Nunn (surname)